This is the discography of American session drummer and songwriter Josh Freese. Freese has appeared on close to 300 records. He is an original member of A Perfect Circle and a member of the Vandals as well as Devo. He was the drummer for Nine Inch Nails from late 2005 until late 2008, and for Guns N' Roses from mid-1998 to 1999.

Discography

Solo
The Notorious One Man Orgy (2000)
Since 1972 (2009)
My New Friends (2011)

With The Vandals
Fear of a Punk Planet (1990)
Sweatin' to the Oldies: The Vandals Live (1994)
Live Fast, Diarrhea (1995)
Oi to the World!: Christmas With the Vandals (1996)
The Quickening (1996)
Hitler Bad, Vandals Good (1998)
Look What I Almost Stepped In (2000)
Internet Dating Superstuds (2002)
Hollywood Potato Chip (2004)

As featured artist

Rock music discographies
Discographies of American artists